Jack Emanuel (in some records spelt Emmanuel)  (13 December 1918 – 19 August 1971) was an Australian colonial administrator who served as district commissioner in the East New Britain district of Papua New Guinea who was posthumously awarded the George Cross, the highest British (and Commonwealth) award for bravery out of combat, for gallantry displayed between July 1969 and 19 August 1971. Emanuel served as a police officer and fireman in Australia before accepting a posting as patrol officer (kiap) to the Australian-administered United Nations trust territory of New Guinea, shortly after the Second World War. Emanuel was appointed acting district commissioner for East New Britain in 1969, and was confirmed in this role in 1971. He was well-respected as a local government official and noted for his willingness to negotiate resolutions to local disputes without police escort.  Emanuel was trying to discuss a resolution to a land dispute between European settlers and the Tolai people in August 1971 when he was stabbed to death during negotiations. His killers were brought to trial and his death shocked the Tolai who largely abandoned the dispute.

Early life 

Emanuel was born on 13 December 1918, in Enfield, New South Wales.  His parents were Robert and Elsie Emanuel; though given the forenames Errol John he was commonly known as Jack Emanuel. Emanuel attended school in Sydney and joined the New South Wales Police Force in June 1940. In 1941, he joined the New South Wales Fire Brigades. Emanuel applied to the Department of External Territories in September 1944 for a posting with the New Guinea Police Force but was told that civil administration in the Territory of New Guinea (modern-day Papua New Guinea), which was a League of Nations mandate of Australia, had ceased following the 1942 Japanese invasion. He married Alma May Brown in Bankstown on 7 October 1944, they had one son and one daughter.

New Guinea

Patrol officer and assistant district commissioner 

After the Second World War ended in 1945, Emanuel applied again for a posting to New Guinea, which soon became a United Nations trust territory of Australia. He was accepted and joined the force on 24 August 1946 as a patrol officer (known locally as a kiap). The kiap was the principal officer of local government in the territory, which lacked a representative legislature. They were responsible for a wide variety of roles concerned with governing the local people. They acted as magistrates, police officers, surveyors, census takers, health officers, and construction supervisors. Between 1956 and 1965 Emanuel was posted to the Gazelle Peninsula in northeastern East New Britain as assistant district commissioner and became fluent in the language of the local Tolai people.

Many of the people of the territory were hostile to the Australian administration; Emanuel's district included around 70,000 members of the Tolai people, who were particularly hostile.  Some of the Tolai leaders objected to the new councils established by the Australians to administer the territory, viewing them as undermining their authority. The introduction of a new tax in the late 1950s also inflamed local opinion. In August 1958 during a visit to Navuneram, to enforce the tax a violent confrontation erupted. In an attempted show of force, Emanuel fired his pistol into the air and the police contingent were also ordered, not by Emanuel, to fire above the villagers' heads. Some shots hit the villagers and two were killed.

The American missionary G. T. Bustin recalled meeting Emanuel in his 1959 autobiography Gospel Trail Blazing. He noted "I have never before met an officer who is the equal of Jack Emanuel.  He never raises his voice when dealing with these people. He quietly slips among them and has them drop their spears and unstring their bows. He is always kind even when he has to be stern. He loves these poor people of the bush".  Alma worked as a nurse in the Rabaul Infant Welfare Clinic.  She died on 18 June 1965 and the Tolai attended a funeral in her honour. Emanuel afterward married Ellen Agnes and had a third child.

District commissioner 

Violence again flared in 1969 when the Australians decided the Gazelle Peninsula council should consist of representatives from other peoples, as well as the Tolai. In July 1969 Emanuel was appointed acting district commissioner for the East New Britain portion of the recently united Territory of Papua and New Guinea, this was a more senior role but again with a wide range of local government administration responsibilities. Emanuel, based in Rabaul, was given the particular task to reduce conflict and restore local government in the Gazelle Peninsula. In November around 7,000 Tolai protested on the streets of Rabaul.

Emanuel was appointed to the district commissioner role full time in 1971. Under Emanuel, who was regarded as a liberal and well respected commissioner, the Gazelle Peninsula achieved one of the highest literacy rates in the territory.

Emanuel often travelled alone to meet with residents at night time, in an attempt to build trust. At confrontations between locals and the police he often left the safety of the police ranks to meet with representatives and try to avert bloodshed. In his role he received many death threats.

Death and George Cross

The Tolai had a long standing dispute with European settlers over a cocoa plantation on the Gazelle Peninsula. They claimed they were entitled to compensation from the authorities for land taken and a share of profits in the Tolai Cocoa Project. They had previously attempted to take over a cocoa fermentary by force.

On 19 August 1971, Tolai in war paint had assembled at Kabaira plantation on the Gazelle Peninsula and were confronted by the police. Emanuel was invited by some of the Tolai to discuss the dispute and he left the police and accompanied them into the bush. He was fatally stabbed with a Second World War Japanese bayonet shortly after beginning negotiations. Emanuel staggered back towards the police lines but collapsed and died before reaching them. The motive for the killing is thought to be Emanuel's involvement in the 1958 incident at Navuneram.  

Emanuel's killers, Tolai leader William Taupa and four others, were afterwards arrested and brought to justice following a complex trial reported to have cost around AU$250,000. Some 1,000 Australian troops were deployed to the Tolai lands to maintain the peace. The Australian administration considered imposing collective punitive measures against the Tolai, but decided against this course. The Tolai people were generally shocked by the murder and the incident led to them largely abandoning the land protest movement.

Emanuel's funeral in Rabaul was attended by around 10,000 people. Emanuel was awarded the George Cross, the highest British and Commonwealth award for bravery out of combat, for gallantry displayed between July 1969 and 19 August 1971. The award was notified in the London Gazette of 1 February 1972. Ellen declined a formal presentation and received the award in the post, dispatched on 29 March 1972. The medal came into the ownership of the government of Papua New Guinea and was sold in 1978 for £3,000. A memorial to Emanuel stands in Canberra, Australia.

References

Australian expatriates in Papua New Guinea
Australian firefighters
Australian police officers
Australian recipients of the George Cross
People from the Inner West (Sydney)
1918 births
1971 deaths
Australian people murdered abroad
Male murder victims
People murdered in Papua New Guinea
Deaths by bayonet